The 2nd season of The Bachelor premiered on September 7, 2021 on Alpha TV. This season featured the second greek bachelor, 35-year-old Alexis Pappas from Northern Epirus, he has worked as a model both in Greece and abroad, having in his CV collaborations with brands such as Davidoff, Mont Blanc, Intimissimi, Guess, Armani and Diesel. He has also worked as an actor, in television and cinema, with his best known television participation in the series 8 Lexis in the 2019-2020 season. In the period 2020-2021 he took part in the eighth season of the Survivor Greece, becoming particularly well known to the general public.

Contestants

Call-out order
 The contestant received a first impression rose
 The contestant received a rose during the date
 The contestant was eliminated
 The contestant was eliminated outside the rose ceremony
 The contestant was eliminated during the date
 The contestant was given a rose at the Rose Ceremony and rejected it
 The contestant quit the competition
 The contestant won the competition

Ratings

Note

  Outside top 20.

References

External links
 Official website

2021 Greek television seasons
Greek (season 02)